John Proctor French (1903–1952) was an English professional footballer who made over 170 appearances as a right back in the Football League for Southend United. He later captained the Brentford reserve team to a London Combination title.

Personal life 
French's grandson, Trevor Hoffman, is a former professional baseball relief pitcher who was inducted into the Baseball Hall of Fame in 2018.

Career statistics

Honours 
Brentford Reserves
 London Combination: 1932–33

References

1903 births
1952 deaths
Footballers from Stockton-on-Tees
Footballers from County Durham
English footballers
Association football fullbacks
Middlesbrough F.C. players
Southend United F.C. players
Brentford F.C. players
Tunbridge Wells F.C. players
English Football League players
Southern Football League players